or Second Hanzō, nicknamed , was a famous Ninja of the Sengoku era, who served the Tokugawa clan as a ninja, credited with saving the life of Tokugawa Ieyasu and then helping him to become the ruler of united Japan. He is often a subject of varied portrayal in modern popular culture. Hanzō was known as an expert tactician and a master of sword fighting.

Early life
He would later earn the nickname  because of the fearless tactics he displayed in his operations; this moniker also distinguished him from Watanabe Hanzo (Watanabe Moritsuna), who is nicknamed .

Though Hanzō was born in Mikawa Province (now Iga-chō, Okazaki, Aichi), he often returned to Iga Province, home of the Hattori family. At the age of 16, his first battle was a night time attack during the siege of Udo Castle (1557). At the time, he commanded seventy Iga ninja.

Service under Ieyasu
Hanzo had a great contribution to Tokugawa Ieyasu's rise to power, helping the future Shogun bring down the Imagawa clan. After Imagawa Ujizane had held Ieyasu's wife and son as hostages in 1561, Hanzo made a successful hostage rescue of Tokugawa's family at Kaminogo castle in 1562<ref>Tools and Techniques (2009), p. 94</ref> and went on to lay siege to Kakegawa castle in 1569 against the Imagawa clan.

He served with distinction at the battles of Anegawa in 1570 and Mikatagahara in 1572.
According to the Kansei Chōshū Shokafu, a genealogy of major samurai completed in 1812 by the Tokugawa shogunate, Hattori Hanzō rendered meritorious service during the Battle of Mikatagahara and became commander of an Iga unit consisting of one hundred fifty men. He captured a Takeda spy named Chikuan, and when Takeda's troops invaded Totomi, Hanzō counterattacked with only thirty warriors at the Tenryū River.

His most valuable contribution came in 1582 following Oda Nobunaga's death, when he led the future shōgun Tokugawa Ieyasu to safety in Mikawa Province across Iga territory with the help of remnants of the local Iga-ryū ji-samurai clansAndrew Adams, Ninja: The Invisible Assassins (1970), p. 43 
as well as Kōga-ryū the neighboring local samurai families in the nearby Koka region.Haha Lung, Ninja Shadowhand, The Art of Invisibility (2004), p. 50 Hanzo was principal in serving as Ieyasu's guide and commanded 300 ninja guards to ensure his lord's safe passage to Mikawa.

In 1584, Hattori Hanzo continued to serve his lord at Battle of Komaki and Nagakute with 100 warriors under his command.

In 1590, Hattori Hanzo served during the Odawara campaign and was awarded 8,000 koku. By the time Ieyasu entered Kantō, he was awarded an additional 8,000 koku and had 30 yoriki and 200 public officials for his services. Ieyasu was said to have also begun to employ more Iga ninja with Hanzō as their leader.

Historical sources say he lived the last several years of his life as a monk under the name "Sainen" and built the temple Sainenji, which was named after him and mainly built to commemorate Tokugawa Ieyasu's elder son, Tokugawa Nobuyasu.

After Nobuyasu was accused of treason and conspiracy by Oda Nobunaga and was then ordered to commit seppuku by his father, Ieyasu.  Hanzo was called in to act as the official second to end Nobuyasu's suffering, but he refused to take the sword on the blood of his own lord. Ieyasu valued his loyalty after hearing of Hanzo's ordeal and said, "Even a demon can shed tears."Arthur Lindsay Sadler, The Maker of Modern Japan: The Life of Tokugawa Ieyasu, C. E. Tuttle Co., 1978

Death

He died at the age of 55 in 1597. There are two theories about his death. One asserts that he was assassinated by a rival Samurai, the pirate Fūma Kotarō. After Hanzo tracked him down to the Inland Sea, Kotarō lured him and his men into a small channel and used oil to set the channel on fire. The second theory is that Hanzo became a monk in Edo where he lived out the rest of his days until he died of illness.

Legacy

Hanzo's reputation as a samurai leader who commanded a 200-men strong unit of Iga warriors has grown to legendary proportions. Tales of Hattori's exploits often attributed various supernatural abilities, such as teleportation, psychokinesis, and precognition.

After his death on 4 November 1596, Hattori Hanzō was succeeded by his son, whose name was also Masanari (third Hanzō), though written with different kanji (正就 instead of 正成). He was given the title of Iwami no Kami and his Iga men would act as guards of Edo Castle, the headquarters of the government of united Japan. Hanzō is actually a name passed down through the leaders of the Hattori family meaning his father was also called Hanzō and so was his successor. Indeed, there are five people known as Hattori Hanzō throughout history.

To this day, artifacts of Hanzō's legacy remain. Tokyo Imperial Palace (formerly the shōgun''s palace) still has a gate called Hanzō's Gate (Hanzōmon), and the Hanzōmon subway line which runs from Hanzōmon Station in central Tokyo to the southwestern suburbs is named after the gate, where his house was once located. The neighborhood outside Hanzō's Gate is known as Wakaba, but before 1943 was named Iga-chō ("Iga Town"). Hanzō's remains now rest in the Sainen-ji temple cemetery in Yotsuya, Tokyo. The temple also holds his favorite spear and his ceremonial battle helmet.

See also 
 Fūma Kotarō

References

External links 
 Hattori Hanzô (Character) at the Internet Movie Database
 Hattori Hanzo - Vintage Ninja
 Sainenji, a buddhist temple that houses the spear of the famous samurai and ninja Hattori Hanzo also known as the “Demon Hanzo” 

1542 births
1596 deaths
Japanese ninjutsu practitioners
Japanese spies
Ninja
People from Okazaki, Aichi
People of Azuchi–Momoyama-period Japan
People of Muromachi-period Japan
Samurai